Kuala Lumpur competed in the Premier 1 and FA Cup in season 2002. They finished 13th in the league and were relegated for the first time in their history and failed to qualify for the Malaysia Cup for the first time since 1996. Iraqi Wathiq Naji Jassim was removed as coach after the first match of the season and was replaced by Lim Kim Lian. Nigerian striker Onyema Ikechukwu played only two matches before having his contract terminated after failing to recover from a hamstring injury.



Results and fixtures
Note: scores are written KL first.

Tables

Malaysian Premier 1

Scorers

2002